iQIYI, formerly Qiyi, is a Chinese online video platform based in Beijing and Shanghai launched on April 22, 2010.

iQIYI is currently one of the largest online video sites in the world, with nearly 6 billion hours spent on its service each month and over 500 million monthly active users. On March 29, 2018, the company issued its IPO (initial public offering) in the U.S. and raised $2.25 billion. iQIYI has not been available in Taiwan since October 15, 2020 due to a Taiwan government ban on partnerships with mainland Chinese video streaming companies.

History 
iQIYI was founded on April 22, 2010, by Baidu, the company behind China's largest online search engine, with support from Providence Equity Partners. It changed its name to iQIYI in November 2011. On November 2, 2012, Baidu bought Providence's stake and took 100% ownership of the site. On May 7, 2013, Baidu purchased the online video business of PPStream Inc. for $370 million, which became a subsidiary of iQIYI much later. On 17 July 2014, the site launched its film production division, iQIYI Motion Pictures, to expand existing cooperative projects with overseas peers, including purchasing releases and co-producing movies. On September 4, iQIYI cooperated with Venice Film Festival, streaming of the festival's movies online. In August 2014, iQIYI generated over 6.95 billion hours of viewing on its website. In October, iQIYI participated in the Busan Film Festival, signing exclusive rights to nearly 100 South Korean titles. On November 19, 2014, Xiaomi and Shunwei Capital invested $300 Million in iQIYI for about 10 percent to 15 percent of the site, while Baidu invested an additional $100 million and held about 80 percent.

On December 8, 2014,  iQIYI's chief content officer Ma Dong said the portal planned to more than double original production in 2015, with at least 30 titles and 500 episodes on the slate compared to 13 in 2014. In 2015, iQIYI purchased the streaming rights to eight top entertainment shows in mainland China, and several entertainment shows in Taiwan and South Korea, including Running Man. In March 2016, it announced that it would launch in Taiwan. In June 2016, it reported that it had 20 million subscribers.

In June 2014, iQIYI co-produced and distributed the drama Mysterious Summer with major Japanese broadcaster Fuji TV. It was the first drama co-production between China and Japan and has been viewed more than 60 million times as of October 2014.

On April 25, 2017, Netflix (which does not operate at all in China) announced that it had reached a licensing deal with iQIYI, under which some Netflix original productions would be available on iQIYI day-and-date with their premieres worldwide.

In November 2018, iQIYI announced that it was raising new cash. The video business said that it will issue $500 million in convertible senior notes. Proceeds from the offering will go towards content and technology investments as well as capped call transactions to reduce potential dilution to shareholders upon conversion of the notes.

In August 2019, iQIYI soft launched the multilingual, globally-available iQIYI app, which provides local languages such as English, Thai, Malay language, Vietnamese, and Indonesian. The company has recently been expanding its international footprint, and launched iq.com for global users.

In December 2020, iQIYI opened a new office in Singapore at Robinson Road to serve as the regional headquarters for Southeast Asia. The company also announced that it will hire 200 new employees over the course of the next 5 years, and will commit to creating more localized content.

In 2020, iQIYI announced its production of My Roommate Is a Gumiho as its first Korean Original Series. Due to positive reviews over their first self-produced series, which starred Jang Ki-yong and Lee Hye-ri (member of Girl's Day), iQIYI expressed that they gained confidence in releasing more original Korean dramas produced under its name, like their announced upcoming productions of dramas like Bad and Crazy (starring Lee Dong-wook, Han Ji-eun and Wi Ha-joon) in 2021, and Shooting Stars in 2022, with the hope of expanding their potential in the production of original Korean shows.

Also, iQIYI began to expand its horizon on producing Southeast Asian shows to stream as iQIYI originals for more viewership. In August 2021, iQIYI streamed a Singaporean drama series titled The Ferryman: Legends of Nanyang, which will be its first Southeast Asian original series starring local actors from Singapore like Lawrence Wong and Qi Yuwu, and Taiwanese actress Kate Kinney. The drama is also a remake of the 2014 Chinese drama series, but in a Southeast Asian setting.

In October 2021, iQIYI and THEMA went into a partnership to launch their services on Netgem TV in the United Kingdom and Ireland, with iQIYI hoping to distribute Asian content on European media to create a larger global audience. The total subscribers of iQIYI as of October 2021 has reached 106 million worldwide from 191 countries.

During the 26th Busan International Film Festival, iQIYI partnered with Philippine broadcaster ABS-CBN to produce Saying Goodbye and Hello, Heart as the first two Philippine original series which will release later this year. This will be their first local originals in Southeast Asia.

In May 2022, iQIYI Sports announced a streaming rights request to the Italian football competition Serie A. This marks the fifth acquisition since the expansion into the sports market after acquiring streaming rights to other sporting events such as UEFA, AFC, the English Premier League and Spanish La liga.

Reception 
According to iResearch, a widely quoted third-party industry research firm, as of October 2014, iQIYI and PPS had a total of 202.18 million mobile viewers who watched content for 600.62 million hours on these platforms, with mobile videos reaching had a total of 308.17 million mobile viewers who watched content for a total of 1176.44 million hours on these platforms. Total video views reached 500 million. Each viewer watched content for an average of 229.05 minutes in October. In mid-2015 the site had 5 million subscribers, in late 2015/early 2016 it had over 10 million and by June 2016, it had 20 million.

Controversies 
In April 2020, activist investors, including Muddy Waters Research, accused iQIYI of overstating its revenue and subscribers. Short-seller Wolfpack Research also accused the company of inflating revenue numbers. In August 2020, it was announced that the U.S. Securities and Exchange Commission subsequently launched an investigation into iQIYI. Later in early October 2020, iQIYI made a statement that an internal review into the allegations of fraud made by the American short seller Wolfpack Research, “did not uncover any evidence that would substantiate the allegations.” The internal review had been conducted by an independent audit committee, which included "a Big 4 accounting firm that is not the Company's auditor."

In June 2020, the Beijing Internet Court sided with a customer who sued the company for breaching the terms and conditions of the 'VIP' subscription. iQIYI had charged additional fees for pre-screens of dramas, although paying customers were promised access at no extra charge.

See also
List of iQIYI original programming
List of streaming media services

References

IQIYI 
Astro Malaysia Holdings television channels
Television channels and stations established in 2019
2019 establishments in Malaysia